In Greek mythology, Bounos or Bunus (Ancient Greek: Βοῦνος means 'hill, mound') was the Corinthian son of Hermes and Alcidamia.

Mythology 
Bunus received the throne of Ephyra (an early name of Corinth) from Aeëtes, when the latter decided to migrate to Colchis, biding him to keep it until he or his children came back. He is said to have built a sanctuary to Hera Bunaea on the road which led up to Acrocorinthus. After the death of Bounus, Epopeus of Sicyon, who had come from Thessaly, extended his own kingdom to include Corinth.

Notes

References 
Grimal, Pierre, The Dictionary of Classical Mythology, Wiley-Blackwell, 1996.  
Pausanias, Description of Greece with an English Translation by W.H.S. Jones, Litt.D., and H.A. Ormerod, M.A., in 4 Volumes. Cambridge, MA, Harvard University Press; London, William Heinemann Ltd. 1918. . Online version at the Perseus Digital Library 
Pausanias, Graeciae Descriptio. 3 vols. Leipzig, Teubner. 1903.  Greek text available at the Perseus Digital Library.

Kings of Corinth
Kings in Greek mythology
Children of Hermes
Demigods in classical mythology
Corinthian characters in Greek mythology
Epithets of Hera